The 1936 Idaho Vandals football team represented the University of Idaho in the 1936 college football season. The Vandals were led by second-year head coach Ted Bank, and were members of the Pacific Coast Conference. Home games were played on campus in Moscow at MacLean Field, with none in Boise.

Idaho compiled a  overall record and lost all four games in the PCC.

In the Battle of the Palouse with neighbor Washington State, the Vandals suffered a ninth straight loss, falling  at homecoming in Moscow on October 10. Idaho's most recent win in the series was eleven years earlier in 1925 and the next was eighteen years away in 1954.

Future coaches among the Vandal players included sophomores Tony Knap, Lyle Smith, and Steve Belko. Future athletic director Leon Green, grandfather of UI president Scott Green, played right end and was a team captain.

This was the final season for varsity football at MacLean Field and its final game on November 21 was a Vandal win; grading began on the new stadium site to the west in late summer 1936, and it opened the following season as

Schedule

 The Little Brown Stein trophy for the Montana game debuted two years later in 1938
 One game was played on Thursday (Utah State at Ogden on Thanksgiving)

All-conference
No Vandals were named to the All-Coast team; honorable mention were tackle Stonko Pavkov, guard John Cooper, halfback Clarence Devlin, and fullback Ross Sundberg.

References

External links
Gem of the Mountains: 1937 University of Idaho yearbook – 1936 football season
Go Mighty Vandals – 1936 football season
Idaho Argonaut – student newspaper – 1936 editions

Idaho
Idaho Vandals football seasons
Idaho Vandals football